Nara Ramamurthy Naidu is an Indian politician. He was elected to the Andhra Pradesh Legislative Assembly from Chandragiri in the 1994 Andhra Pradesh Legislative Assembly election as a member of the Telugu Desam Party.

He is brother of former Chief Minister of Andhra Pradesh Nara Chandrababu Naidu and father of actor Nara Rohit.

References

1952 births
Living people
Telugu Desam Party politicians
People from Chittoor district
Andhra Pradesh MLAs 1994–1999